WAVL (100.5 FM, "Wave 100.5") is a radio station licensed to Rothschild, Wisconsin, United States. The station is currently owned by Steven Resnick, through licensee Sunrise Broadcasting LLC.

On December 26, 2019, WAVL ended its Christmas music stunt and launched an adult contemporary format, branded as "Wave 100.5".

Previous logos

References

External links

AVL (FM)
Marathon County, Wisconsin
Radio stations established in 2010
2010 establishments in Wisconsin
Mainstream adult contemporary radio stations in the United States